The Northern Territory Minister for Infrastructure, Planning and Logistics is a Minister of the Crown in the Government of the Northern Territory. The minister administers their portfolio through the Department of Infrastructure, Planning and Logistics.

The Minister is responsible for assets and program management, the aviation industry, building advisory services, Darwin Ports, development and management of strategic industrial and residential land, domestic and international air services, economic development facilitation, the freight industry, infrastructure provision, land administration, land information, land use planning and development assessment, lands and planning, logistics industry, maritime industry, Offshore Supply Base, ports development, procurement in infrastructure services, public transport, the rail industry, regional air services development, release of industrial and residential land, road network management, road transport, shipping industry, strategic growth and infrastructure planning, transport assets, transport policy and planning and transport safety (marine, rail and road). They are also responsible for the Development Consent Authority, the Northern Territory Planning Commission and the AustralAsia Railway Corporation.

The current minister has been Eva Lawler (Labor) since 7 September 2020, who succeeded Manison after a reshuffle of the cabinet following Labor's second consecutive win at the 2020 election.

List of Ministers for Infrastructure, Planning and Logistics

Former posts

Lands and Planning

Infrastructure

Transport

AustralAsia Railway

Territory Ports

References

Northern Territory-related lists
Ministers of the Northern Territory government